Gladys Sylvani (December 18, 1884 – 1953) was a British actor. One of Britain's first film stars, during her career, she was described as "the most popular of all English picture actresses".

She was born Gladys Sylvani Smith in Holloway, London. Before her work in films, Sylvani had performed on stage. She was part of a group of actors who appeared regularly in silent films by Cecil Hepworth. Sylvani retired while at the peak of her career. In 1939, she moved to the United States. She died in Alexandria, Virginia.

Filmography 
  (1911)
  (1911)
  (1911)
 Mother's Boy (1911)
  (1911)
  (1911)
  (1911)
  (1911)
  (1911)
  (1911)
  (1911)
  (1911)
  (1911)
  (1911)
  (1911)
  (1912)
 The Heart of a Woman (1912)
  (1912)
  (1912)
  (1912)
  (1912)
  (1912)
  (1912)
  (1912)
  (1912)
  (1912)
  (1912)
  (1912)
  (1912)
  (1912)
  (1912)
  (1912)
  (1912)
  (1912)
 Fisherman's Luck (1913)

References

External links 
 

1884 births
1953 deaths
Actresses from London
English expatriates in the United States
English silent film actresses
20th-century English actresses